This is a list of hospitals in the U.A.E. They are categorized by emirates/regions whether they are government or private hospitals, and number of beds

Abu Dhabi (City)
 Phoenix Specialty Hospital, Abu Dhabi (Private)
 Ahalia Hospital, Abu Dhabi (Private)
 Al Noor Hospital
 Bareen International Hospital, MBZ

 Al Raha Hospital, Abu Dhabi (Private)
 American Hospital Abu Dhabi
 Burjeel Hospital, Abu Dhabi (Private)
 Cleveland Clinic Abu Dhabi, multi-speciality luxury hospital in Abu Dhabi
 Danat Al Emarat Women & Children’s Hospital, Abu Dhabi
 Dar Al Shifaa (Private)
 Healthpoint hospital a Mubadala company, is a multi-specialty, integrated practice hospital located in Zayed Sports City, Abu Dhabi.
 LLH Hospital, Abu Dhabi (Private)
 LLH Hospital Musaffah, Abu Dhabi (Private)
 Lifecare Hospital, Musaffah, Abu Dhabi (Private)
 Lifecare Hospital, Baniyas, Abu Dhabi (Private)
 Medeor 24x7 Hospital, Abu Dhabi (Private)
 Mediclinic Hospital, Abu Dhabi (Private)
 National Hospital, Abu Dhabi (Private)
 Nation Hospital, Abu Dhabi (Private)
 NMC Specialty Hospital, Abu Dhabi (Private)
 Salama Hospital, Abu Dhabi (Private)
 Shaikh Khalifa Medical City (SEHA - Abu Dhabi Health Services Company, managed by Cleveland Clinic)
 Sheikh Shakhbout Medical City (SEHA - Managed by Mayo Clinic)
 Universal Hospital, Abu Dhabi (Private)

Ajman
 Shikh Khalifa Specialty General Hospital (Government of Ajman)
 Saudi German Hospital Ajman
 Sheikh Khalifa Hospital Ajman (under the aegis of Ministry of Presidential Affairs)
 Thumbay Hospital Nuaimiya Ajman (Thumbay Group)
 Thumbay University Hospital Al Jurf Ajman (Thumbay Group)
 Thumbay Physical therapy and Rehabilitation Hospital Al Jurf Ajman (Thumbay Group)
 Amina Hospital

Al Ain
 Al Ain Hospital, Al Ain (managed by SEHA (Abu Dhabi Health Services Co. P.J.S.C)))
 Ain Al Khaleej Hospital, Al Ain (Private)
 Burjeel Royal Hospital, Al Ain (Private, managed by VPS Healthcare Group)
 Emirates International Hospital, Al Ain (Private)
 Medeor 24x7 International Hospital, Al Ain (Private, managed by VPS Healthcare Group)
 Mediclinic Al Jowhara (Mediclinic International)
 Mediclinic Al Ain (Mediclinic International)
 NMC Specialty Hospital, Al Ain (Private, managed by NMC Health)
 Oasis Hospital, Al Ain (Private, managed by CURE International)
 Tawam Hospital, Al Ain (managed by SEHA (Abu Dhabi Health Services Co. P.J.S.C))affiliation with Johns Hopkins Medicine)
 Universal Hospital, Al Ain (Private, managed by Universal Hospital, Abu Dhabi))

Dubai

Hospitals and Clinics under Dubai Health Authority (DHA) Authority 
 HMS Mirdif Hospital - Best Hospital in Dubai
 HMS Al Garhoud Hospital - Best Hospital in Dubai
 FIFA Medical Centre of Excellence- Best Sports Medicine Clinic Dubai
 HMS DxBone Excellence Center- Orthopedic Center in Dubai
 American Hospital Dubai, Oud Metha, Bur Dubai, Mohd & Obaid Almulla Group Group (private)
 American Medical Center, Jumeirah Lake Towers, Dubai.
 Armada Hospital, Armada One Day Surgical Center, Jumeirah Lake Towers, Armada Towers, Armada Group (private)
 Armada Medical Center, Jumeirah Lake Towers, Armada Towers
 Aster Hospitals, (Mankhool, Qusais)
 Al Shunnar Plastic Surgery (private)
Burjeel Hospital for Advanced Surgery, Dubai (private)
Dubai Herbal and Treatment Centre, Dubai
 Dubai Hospital, (Dubai Health Authority)
 Dubai Cosmetic Surgery Clinic
Emirates Hospital Jumeirah, Dubai (private)
Fakeeh University Hospital, Dubai Silicon Oasis, Fakeeh Care Group
 Nanoori Spine and Joint Clinic (private)
 Kings College Hospital, Dubai (private)
 Mediclinic Welcare Hospital Dubai (Mediclinic International)
 Mediclinic Parkview Hospital (Mediclinic International)
Medeor 24x7 Hospital, Dubai (private)
Prime Hospital, Dubai (private)
Rashid Hospital, (Dubai Health Authority)
 Saudi German Hospital Dubai, Dubai (private)
 Saudi German Clinics Jumeirah
Zulekha Hospitals, Al-Nahda, Dubai
EuroMed clinic, Dubai
Laser Skin Care Clinic, Dubai

Hospitals and Clinics under Dubai Healthcare City (DHCC) Authority 
 Dr. Sulaiman Al-Habib Medical Center
 Mediclinic City Hospital (Mediclinic International)
 Moorfields Eye Hospital (Dubai) Dubai (affiliated with Moorfields Eye Hospital in London)
 Clemenceau Medical Center - Dubai (affiliated with Clemenceau Medical Center International)
 Iranian Hospital, Dubai

Fujairah
 Al Sharq Hospital
 Fujairah Hospital
 Thumbay Hospital, Fujairah (Thumbay Group)

Ras Al Khaimah
 Al Zahrawi Hospital
 Al Oraibi Hospital
 RAK Hospital 
 Saqr Hospital
 Sheikh Khalifa Specialty Hospital
 Thumbay clinic

Sharjah 
 Central Hospital
 Al Qasimi Hospital
 Zulekha Hospitals
 Al Zahra Hospital
 Kalba Hospital
 Al Dhaid Hospital 
 Khorfakkan Hospital
 Kuwait Hospital
 University Hospital of Sharjah

Umm Al Quwain
 Sheikh Khalifa General Hospital
 Thumbay clinics (owned by Thumbay Group)

References

 Hospitals
Hospitals
United Arab Emirates
United Arab Emirates